Yeşildere is a town in Karaman Province, Turkey

Geography 

The town is situated at the south Toros Mountains along the valley of İbrala rivulet. The population of the town is 1264 and is on the decrease.

History 

The former name of the town was İbrala. Only a few documents about the history of İbrala survive. Probably the town was founded during medieval age,  for the mosque of the town had been built on the ruins of a church (The name of the mosque is  kilisecamii meaning church mosque)  However, there were Christian Turks around Karaman area up to 20th century and the church might be built at a later period. (see Karamanlides) Formerly a village, Yeşildere was declared a town in 1954.

Economy 
Yeşildere is a typical agricultural town. Irrigation has always been a problem . But there is a small dam under construction on the rivulet which is planned to irrigate . Yeşildere residents hope that this may prevent further loss in population.

Future

According to Sustainable development report prepared by the Ministry of Environment and Forestry (Turkey) the projected population of Yeşildere in 2025 is 8000. The present master plan  of the town is found to be sufficient for the future expansion.

References 

Populated places in Karaman Province
Towns in Turkey
Karaman Central District